The Eastern Caribbean Central Bank (ECCB) is the central bank for the Eastern Caribbean dollar and is the monetary authority for the members of the Organisation of Eastern Caribbean States (OECS), with the exception of the British Virgin Islands, Guadeloupe and Martinique. Two of its core mandates are to maintain price and financial sector stability, by acting as a stabilizer and safe-guard of the banking system in the Eastern Caribbean Economic and Currency Union (OECS/ECCU.) 

It was founded in October 1983 with the goal of maintaining the stability and integrity of the subregion's currency and banking system in order to facilitate the balanced growth and development of its member states.

The bank is headquartered in Basseterre, St. Kitts, and is currently overseen by Mr. Timothy Antoine, the Bank Governor. Prior to assuming his post in February 2016, the bank was overseen by the late Sir K. Dwight Venner.

In early 2015, the bank announced plans to phase out the production of the 1 and 2 cent pieces. The date was finalised as July 1, 2015. When a motive was sought, it was stated that it takes about six cents to make one cent pieces and about eight cents to make a 2 cent piece.

Governors
Sir Cecil Jacobs, 1973 to 1989
Sir K. Dwight Venner, 1989 to 2015
Timothy Antoine, since 2015

See also 

 Eastern Caribbean dollar (EC$)
 Economy of the Caribbean
 Eastern Caribbean Securities Exchange
 Central banks and currencies of the Caribbean
 Currencies of the British West Indies
 List of banks in the Americas
 List of countries by leading trade partners
 List of countries by public debt

 List of countries by credit rating
 List of Commonwealth of Nations countries by GDP
 List of Latin American and Caribbean countries by GDP growth
 List of Latin American and Caribbean countries by GDP (nominal)
 List of Latin American and Caribbean countries by GDP (PPP)
 List of countries by tax revenue as percentage of GDP
 List of countries by future gross government debt

References

External links
 Eastern Caribbean Central Bank Web site

Banks established in 1983
Banks of the Caribbean
Banks of Dominica
Banks of Saint Lucia
Central banks
Economy of Anguilla
Economy of Antigua and Barbuda
Economy of Grenada
Economy of Montserrat
Economy of Saint Kitts and Nevis
Economy of Saint Vincent and the Grenadines
Economy of the Caribbean Community
Economy of the Organisation of Eastern Caribbean States